Séan O'Neill is a Gaelic footballer from County Louth, Ireland. He plays for the Louth senior inter county football team and for his club Cooley Kickhams.

References

External links
http://www.gaainfo.com/players/football/louth/Sean%20O%27Neill.php 

Year of birth missing (living people)
Living people
Cooley Kickhams Gaelic footballers
Louth inter-county Gaelic footballers